Press to Play is the sixth solo studio album by English musician Paul McCartney, released on 25 August 1986. It was McCartney's first album of entirely new music since Pipes of Peace in 1983, and his first solo album to be issued internationally by EMI following a six-year alliance with Columbia Records in the United States and Canada. Keen to re-establish himself after his poorly received 1984 musical film Give My Regards to Broad Street, McCartney enlisted producer Hugh Padgham to give the album a contemporary sound.

On release, Press to Play received a mixed critical reception and was McCartney's poorest-selling studio album up to that point. Although it failed to make the top 20 in America, the album peaked at number 8 on the UK Albums Chart and achieved gold status from the BPI in September 1986. Four singles were issued from Press to Play: "Press", "Pretty Little Head", "Stranglehold" and "Only Love Remains". "Press" was a minor success, peaking at number 21 in the US. The music video for the song featured McCartney walking around Bond Street and Charing Cross tube stations in London, catching a tube train and speaking with members of the general public.

Production and recording
After the box office flop of the musical film Give My Regards to Broad Street (1984), McCartney decided that it was time for a change of pace in his solo career. In an attempt to give his music a more contemporary sound, he joined forces with Hugh Padgham, an in-demand, multiple award-winning producer famed for having recorded Peter Gabriel, Phil Collins, Genesis, the Human League, the Police, and XTC. McCartney began recording Press to Play in March 1985, having written several new songs, many with current collaborator, 10cc guitarist Eric Stewart who co-wrote eight of the album's 13 songs. One additional song co-written by McCartney and Stewart was released as a B-side ("Hanglide"), while two more songs were later recorded by 10cc for their studio albums ...Meanwhile (1992) and Mirror Mirror (1995).

McCartney recalled in 1986: "When we started working on the record, Hugh came in one day and said he'd had a dream. He dreamed he woke up one morning and had made this really bad, syrupy album with me, an album he hated, and that it had blown his whole career. We took that as a little warning".  Guesting on the album would be the Who's lead guitarist, Pete Townshend, Genesis' drummer and lead vocalist Phil Collins, Split Enz's keyboardist Eddie Rayner and Eric Stewart. Carlos Alomar also overdubbed electric guitar on several tracks, including "Press", "Good Times Coming/Feel the Sun", "It's Not True", "Tough on a Tightrope", "Write Away" and "Move Over Busker", according to his recollections included in the book Paul McCartney: Recording Sessions (1969–2013).

The album was not finished until the end of 1985, by which time only one song would see release from its sessions – the title track to the film Spies Like Us (1985), joined by Phil Ramone in the producer's chair. "Spies Like Us", a non-album single backed by Paul McCartney and Wings' 1975 recording "My Carnival", was a US top 10 hit.

Cover artwork
The album's cover features Paul McCartney and his then-wife, Linda McCartney. The album cover's photograph was taken by George Hurrell, using the same box camera that he used in Hollywood in the 1930s and the 1940s. Hurrell was renowned for his photographs of movie stars of the 1930s and 1940s like Clark Gable and Greta Garbo, to which the album's cover was meant to pay homage.

Release
"Press", a slick up-tempo pop song, was released in July 1986 and went on to become the album's sole top 30 hit. Press to Play itself appeared on 25 August in the United States and 1 September in the United Kingdom. It received lukewarm reviews and proved to be McCartney's weakest-selling studio album up to that point.

Peaking at number 8 in the UK, its chart life was brief, while in the US, Press to Play failed to go gold, peaking at number 30 and selling only 250,000 copies. The follow-up singles, "Pretty Little Head" and "Only Love Remains", performed poorly on the charts. As a result of this disappointing commercial reception, author Howard Sounes writes, McCartney appointed a former Polydor Records executive, Richard Ogden, as his manager, "to help revive his career".

In 1993, Press to Play was remastered and reissued on the CD as part of The Paul McCartney Collection series with his 1985 hit "Spies Like Us" and an alternate mix of impending 1987 UK success "Once Upon a Long Ago" as bonus tracks. In this edition "Press" (4:25) was replaced by the 4:43 remixed version.

Critical reception

AllMusic editor Stephen Thomas Erlewine admired the track "Press", but gave the album a star rating of 2.5 out of 5, saying: "McCartney is dabbling in each of his strengths, just to see what works. It doesn't wind up as one of his stronger albums, but it's more interesting than some of his more consistent ones, and those aforementioned cuts demonstrate that he could still cut effective pop records when he put his mind to it."

In a review for the Chicago Tribune, critic Lynn Van Matre wrote of the album: "No doubt about it, this is McCartney's most rocking album in ages. Much of it's catchy, most of it's fun, and it's superior to McCartney's efforts of recent years." In the Los Angeles Times, Terry Atkinson praised "Press" as "a sprightly, sunny delight – one of the most playful, positive pop songs ever written about the joy of sex and its link with love", but opined that overall "the album finds McCartney as lost as usual and Stewart of little help". Atkinson concluded: "'Press to Play,' though it shows some signs of recovery, is basically just another in a long line (over 12 years!) of post-'Band on the Run' letdowns by a once almost unimaginably creative artist."

More recently, Kit O'Toole of Blogcritics has contended that much of the album belongs among McCartney's "most ambitious work" and that the adventurousness of the project is unfairly overlooked. O'Toole adds: "Press to Play, along with McCartney II, arguably laid the foundation for his future musical experiments under the name The Fireman (particularly the first two albums, Strawberries Oceans Ships Forest and Rushes)."

Track listing

Personnel
Musicians
 Paul McCartney – lead vocals, backing vocals, acoustic piano, keyboards, synthesizers, acoustic and electric guitars, bass guitar
 Nick Glennie-Smith – keyboards
 Eddie Rayner – keyboards 
 Eric Stewart – keyboards, acoustic guitar, electric guitars, harmony vocals
 Simon Chamberlain – acoustic piano, electric grand piano
 Carlos Alomar – acoustic guitar, electric guitars
 Pete Townshend – electric guitars (9)
 Jerry Marotta – drums, percussion
 Graham Ward – drums, percussion 
 Phil Collins – drums and percussion (9)
 Ray Cooper – percussion
 Dick Morrissey – tenor saxophone
 Lenny Pickett – alto saxophone, tenor saxophone
 Gary Barnacle – saxophone
 John Bradbury – violin
 Gavyn Wright – violin
 Nigel Kennedy – violin solo (15)
 Tony Visconti – orchestral arrangements (5)
 Anne Dudley – orchestral arrangements (10)
 Kate Robbins – harmony vocals
 Ruby James – harmony vocals
 Linda McCartney – harmony vocals, spoken word (3)
 James McCartney – spoken word (3)
 John Hammel – spoken word (3)
 Matt Howe – spoken word (3)
 Steve Jackson – spoken word (3)
 Eddie Klein – spoken word (3)

Production and artwork
 Paul McCartney – producer, stereo drawings
 Hugh Padgham – producer (1-13, 15), engineer (1, 2, 4-15), mixing (1-5, 7-11, 13, 14)
 Phil Ramone – producer (14, 15)
 George Hurrell – photography
 Haydn Bendall – additional engineer
 Matt Butler – additional engineer
 Tony Clark – additional engineer
 Matt Howe – additional engineer
 Steve Jackson – additional engineer, engineer (3)
 Jon Kelly – additional engineer
 Peter Mew – additional engineer
 Bert Bevans – mixing (6)
 Steve Forward – mixing (6)
 Julian Mendelsohn – mixing (12)
 George Martin – mixing (15)
 John Hammel – studio technician
 Trevor Jones – studio technician
 Eddie Klein – studio technician

Charts, sales and certifications

Weekly charts

Certifications and sales

Notes
A^ Until January 1987, Japanese albums chart had been separated into LP, CD, and cassette charts. Press to Play also entered the cassette chart at number 21, and peaked at number 8 on the CD chart.

References

External links
 
 JPGR's Beatles site: Paul McCartney's Press to Play

1986 albums
Paul McCartney albums
Parlophone albums
Capitol Records albums
Albums arranged by Tony Visconti
Albums produced by Paul McCartney
Albums produced by Hugh Padgham
Albums produced by Phil Ramone
Synth-pop albums by English artists